Yulián Andrés Gómez Mosquera (born 4 August 1997) is a Colombian footballer who plays as a left-back for Categoría Primera A side Independiente Medellín.

Club career

Independiente Medellín
Gómez joined Independiente Medellín at the age of 16, after being scouted by Tucho Ortiz when he was playing in his hometown, Ortigal. The same coach, Tucho Ortiz, gave Gómez his professional debut for Independiente Medellín in the Categoría Primera B on 9 July 2017 against Millonarios. 19-year old Gómez was in the line up but was replaced in the 81st minute.

In the 2018 season, Gómez was on loan at Real Cartagena where he played 35 games and scored three goals in the Categoría Primera B and later on loan for Unión Magdalena in the 2019, where he played 37 games in the Categoría Primera A.

On 8 March 2020, Gómez got injured against Millonarios. Gómez broke his ankle and underwent his surgical procedure, where he was treated for a fibula fracture and an injury to the medial ligament. He was set to be out for five months.

References

External links
 

1997 births
Living people
Association football fullbacks
Colombian footballers
Categoría Primera A players
Categoría Primera B players
Independiente Medellín footballers
Real Cartagena footballers
Unión Magdalena footballers